Aran Fox (born 23 December 1988) is an English professional ice hockey goaltender, currently without a club after leaving for personal reasons the Manchester Phoenix of the EIHL.  He had been the first player to rise up through the junior ranks of the Phoenix organisation to the EIHL squad.

Fox did not manage to start a game for the Phoenix however, and was used as the back-up goaltender behind the ex-Atlanta Thrashers player Scott Fankhouser.  Fox left the Phoenix EIHL team midway through the 2007/08 season.

External links
Aran Fox Personal Profile, Manchester Phoenix Official Website.
"Altrincham Born Aran Fox Nets Phoenix Role", Manchester Phoenix Official Website, 28/05/07.

1988 births
Living people
English ice hockey goaltenders
Manchester Phoenix players